This is a list of black video game characters. The 2009 study "The virtual census: representations of gender, race and age in video games" published by the University of Southern California showed that black characters appear in video games in proportion to their numbers in the 2000 US census data, but mainly in sports games and in titles that reinforce stereotypes.

Characters

Before 2000s

2000s

2010s

2020s

See also
 List of black animated characters
 List of black superheroes
 Lists of black people
 Race and video games

References

External links
 The Power of Play: The Portrayal and Performance of Race in Video Games at Harvard University
 

 
Video game characters
Black video game characters